Hill Top is a small village in County Durham, in England. It is situated to the north of Eggleston.

References

Villages in County Durham